Yeşilce, historically and still informally called Böög Araptar, is a village in the Şehitkamil District, Gaziantep Province, Turkey. The village is inhabited by Turkmens and had a population of 520 in 2021.

References

Villages in Şehitkamil District